The Saci short-tailed opossum (Monodelphis saci), also known as gnome opossum, is a species of opossum endemic to the rainforests of Brazil.

Characteristics 
They measure  from their nose to the base of the tail. The tail measures . They have a conspicuous reddish head and brown rump and back. The chin, throat, groin and flanks are grayish-brown. There is a distinct central white streak on the chest and abdomen. Their paws are covered with short, light-brown hairs. Males are slightly larger than females.

Distribution 
They live in the lowland rainforests along the south bank of the Brazilian Amazon.

Behavior 
Little is known about their behavior because of their very recent discovery.

Etymology 
They are named after mythical creatures called Saci in Brazilian folklore which wear a red hat to disappear and reappear at will.  Scientists named them so because of their reddish-heads and the fact they eluded discovery for so long.

References 

Opossums
Fauna of the Amazon
Endemic fauna of Brazil
Mammals of Brazil
Mammals described in 2017